Scissors Modes are collective excitations in which two particle systems  move with respect to each other conserving their shape.
For the first time they were predicted to occur  in deformed atomic nuclei by N. LoIudice and F. Palumbo, who used a semiclassical Two Rotor Model, whose solution required a realization of the O(4) algebra that was not known in mathematics. In this model    protons and neutrons were assumed to form two interacting  rotors to be identified with  the blades of  scissors. Their relative motion (Fig.1) generates a magnetic dipole moment whose coupling with the electromagnetic field  provides the signature of the mode.

Such states have  been experimentally observed for the first time by A. Richter and collaborators in a rare earth nucleus, 156Gd, and then  systematically   investigated experimentally and theoretically  in all deformed atomic nuclei.

Inspired by this,  D. Guéry-Odelin and S. Stringari predicted similar collective excitations in Bose-Einstein condensates in magnetic traps. In this case  one of the blades of the scissors must be identified
with the  moving cloud of atoms  and the other one with the trap. Also this excitation mode was experimentally confirmed.

In close analogy similar collective excitations have predicted in a number of other systems, including metal clusters, quantum dots, Fermi condensates and crystals,  but none of them has  yet been experimentally investigated  or found.

References

Quantum mechanics